Elliniki Agogi (Greek Upbringing; Greek: Ελληνική Αγωγή) is a Greek magazine founded in 1995 by Adonis Georgiades. Most texts in the magazine are in the polytonic writing system (without grave accent). The publisher is Ekdoseis Georgiadi, owned by Adonis Georgiades.

References

External links
 Elliniki Agogi (official website)

1995 establishments in Greece
Magazines published in Greece
Greek-language magazines
Magazines established in 1995